Asuksa-nga (also Azucsagna or Asucsagna) is a former  Tongva-Gabrieleño Californian Native American settlement in the San Gabriel Valley. The site is in Los Angeles County, California.

It was on the San Gabriel River, located at a site in present-day Azusa.

See also
Tongva populated places
California mission clash of cultures
Indigenous peoples of California

References

Tongva populated places
Azusa, California
Former settlements in Los Angeles County, California
Former Native American populated places in California
San Gabriel River (California)
San Gabriel Valley